Confession of a Woman is a 2020 Burmese drama film, directed by Mee Pwar starring Daung, Paing Phyo Thu and Sai Si Ton Khan.The film, produced by Thinkayta Film Production premiered in Myanmar on January 9, 2020.

Cast
Daung as Yu Maw
Paing Phyo Thu as Thet Hnin Eain
Sai Si Ton Khan as Ko Aung

References

2020 films
2020s Burmese-language films
Burmese drama films
Films shot in Myanmar